Against the Wall is an American police drama television series created by Annie Brunner. The series stars Rachael Carpani as Abby Kowalski, a police detective who recently joined the Internal Affairs division of the Chicago Police Department.

The series was broadcast in the United States on the cable channel Lifetime, and is a production of Universal Cable Productions. It premiered on July 31, 2011, following Drop Dead Diva.

Overview
The series follows Abby Kowalski, a five-year veteran of the Chicago Police Department, who in order to pursue her dream career as a detective takes the only opening available; in the Internal Affairs Division. Abby's decision to join the department's internal affairs division puts her at odds with members of her own family, themselves members of the Chicago Police Department. Now Abby must find a way to do her job as an IAD detective without tearing her family apart.

Cast and characters

Main
 Rachael Carpani as Abby Kowalski: A fourth generation Chicago police officer whose father and three older brothers are also members of the CPD.  She takes an opening in the department's Internal Affairs Division as a detective, and is involved in a two relationships at the same time, one with her brother Richie's partner John Brody and the other with Danny Mitchell. 
 Andrew W. Walker, as John Brody "Brody": A Chicago police officer, he is Richie Kowalski's partner and is involved in a relationship with Abby.
 Marisa Ramirez as Lina Flores: A Chicago police detective assigned as Abby's partner in the Internal Affairs Division. She is married to a fellow cop and has three sons including a set of twin boys. In the season one finale she gives birth to a baby girl, whom Abby delivers in an elevator, and names her Carlina. 
 Brandon Quinn as Richie Kowalski: A Chicago police officer in the Bureau of Patrol and Abby's youngest older brother. Richie is the closest to Abby since they are the youngest in the family. Richie is married to a woman named Laura and they are expecting a baby.
 Kathy Baker as Sheila Kowalski: The wife of Don Kowalski and mother of Abby, Richie, Donnie and Steve Kowalski. Near the end of season one she opens her own bakery, hiring ex-convicts as her staff.
 Mayko Nguyen as Mackie Phan: Abby Kowalski's best friend and neighbor. She helped Abby's mother open her own bakery. 
 Chris Johnson as Danny Mitchell: An old friend of Abby's who used to work in the State's Attorney's office. He later becomes involved with Abby and competes with Brody to win her heart.
 Treat Williams as Don Kowalski: A Chicago police sergeant in the Bureau of Patrol. He is a third generation cop and is married to Sheila Kowalski. He is the adoptive father of Donnie and father of Steve, Richie and Abby.

Recurring
 Daniel Kash as Lieutenant Papadol: A Chicago police lieutenant. He is Abby Kowalski's superior officer in the Internal Affairs Division. He hails from Toronto, Canada and can be seen with a Tim Hortons mug on his desk.
 James Thomas as Donnie Kowalski: A Chicago police officer and Abby Kowalski's oldest brother.  He was fathered by a man named "Speedo" with Sheila, prior to her meeting Don Kowalski, who subsequently adopted him.  He tests for and transfers into the Chicago P.D. SWAT team. Donnie is recently divorced and has taken an interest in Abby's best friend Mackie.
 Steve Byers as Steve Kowalski: A Chicago police officer in the Bureau of Patrol and Abby Kowalski's middle older brother. Steve is married and has two little girls. 
 Chris Mulkey as Carl Scott: A Chicago police detective assigned to the Internal Affairs Division. He is the investigating officer of the officer-involved shooting case involving Richie Kowalski.

Development and production
On June 23, 2010, Lifetime placed a pilot order for Against the Wall. Annie Brunner wrote the pilot, Dean Parisot was attached to the project as the director, with Nancy Miller serving as executive producer and Annie Brunner as supervising producer. However, Dean Parisot was forced to pull out of directing the pilot due to the death of his wife; he was replaced by Michael Fresco.

Casting announcements began in September 2010, with Rachael Carpani first to be cast, Carpani was cast as Abby Kowalski, "a policewoman who causes a rift with her three cop brothers when she decides to join the department's Internal Affairs Division." Next to join the series was Treat Williams as Don Kowalski, Abby's father, "an old-school career Chicago cop who is rough around the edges but has a real soft spot for his only daughter" until she tells him of her new job. Kathy Baker was next to be cast as Sheila Kowalski, Abby's mother, a Chicago cop's wife. Marisa Ramirez, Brandon Quinn, and Chris Johnson, were the last actors to be cast, with Ramirez playing Lina Flores, Abby's new partner at Internal Affairs, Quinn playing Richie Kowalski, Abby's younger brother, a Chicago Patrol Officer, and Johnson playing Danny Mitchell, Abby's longtime friend, who is also a lawyer.

The network green lighted the series on February 7, 2011, with an order of 13 hour-long episodes. The series is produced by Universal Cable Productions.

Episodes

Reception

Critical reception
Against the Wall has received mixed or average reviews, earning a score of 59 on Metacritic. The New York Daily News said of the series: "Lifetime's new Against the Wall turns out to be first-rate drama. In fact, it's one of the best new shows of the year." The Los Angeles Times gave a positive review: "There's much here to suggest that, if everyone relaxes a little, good things will come." The Hollywood Reporter also gave the pilot a positive review:

But mostly Against the Wall is a pleasant surprise, with Carpani being a much bigger surprise. If Against the Wall can make its disparate parts work, it will be plenty more intriguing than a number of network procedurals. And in the cable game, that's already a victory.

Ratings
The pilot episode premiered with 1.8 million total viewers, scoring 0.9 million viewers in the 18–49 demographic and 0.6 million in the 25–54 demographic.

References

External links
 
 

2010s American crime drama television series
2010s American police procedural television series
2011 American television series debuts
2011 American television series endings
English-language television shows
Fictional portrayals of the Chicago Police Department
Lifetime (TV network) original programming
Television series by Universal Content Productions
Television shows set in Chicago
Television shows filmed in Toronto